Susan Mitchell (born 1944) is an American poet, essayist and translator who wrote the poetry collections Rapture and Erotikon. She is a recipient of the Lannan Literary Award for Poetry.

Life
Mitchell grew up in New York City, New York and now lives in Boca Raton, Florida. She has a B.A. in English literature from Wellesley College, an M.A. from Georgetown University, and was a PhD student at Columbia University. She has taught at Middlebury College and Northeastern Illinois University, and currently holds the Mary Blossom Lee Endowed Chair in Creative Writing at Florida Atlantic University.

She has published poems in literary journals and magazines including The New Yorker, The Atlantic Monthly, The American Poetry Review, The New Republic, Ploughshares, and The Paris Review. Her poems have also been included in five volumes of The Best American Poetry and two Pushcart Prize volumes.

Awards
She has been recognized for her work by notable organizations such as the National Endowment for the Arts, the Guggenheim Foundation, and the Lannan Foundation. Her collection, Rapture, won the Kingsley Tufts Poetry Award and was a National Book Award finalist.

Published works
Erotikon (HarperCollins, 2001)
Rapture (HarperPerennial, 1992)
The Water Inside the Water (Wesleyan University Press, 1983)

Honors and awards
 1993 Kingsley Tufts Poetry Award
 1992 Lannan Literary Award for Poetry
 1982 NEA Literature Fellowship in Poetry
 1992 Guggenheim Fellowship

References

External links
 HarperCollins > Author Page > Susan Mitchell Bio
 Review: Ploughshares Review by Diann Blakely of Rapture
 Review: Valpariso Poetry Review Review by Catherine Daly of Erotikon
 Review: The New York Times > Books in Brief: Poetry > Sunday, April 16, 2000 > Review by Melanie Rehak of Erotikon
 Poem: Library of Congress > Poetry 180: A Poem a Day for American High Schools > The Dead by Susan Mitchell

Online Copies of Susan Mitchell's Poems
 "The Aviary" excerpt
 "Children's Ward: New York Hospital"
 "Havana Birth"
 "Night Music"
 "Pussy Willow (An Apology)"
 "Wind/Breath, Breath/Wind"

1944 births
Living people
Florida Atlantic University alumni
Columbia University alumni
Georgetown University alumni
Northeastern Illinois University faculty
Middlebury College faculty
American women poets
National Endowment for the Arts Fellows
Writers from New York City
Poets from Florida
American women academics
Florida Atlantic University faculty
Wellesley College alumni
21st-century American women